Li Zhuoran (1899–1989) was a Chinese Communist politician who was the ninth president of the Party School of the Central Committee of the Communist Party of China, the highest training center for party workers and leaders. Li Zhouran served as president from 1954 to 1955.

External links

Mini-profile of Li Zhuoran

Chinese Communist Party politicians from Hunan
1899 births
1989 deaths
Politicians from Xiangtan
Republic of China politicians from Hunan
People's Republic of China politicians from Hunan
Communist University of the Toilers of the East alumni